Sphingonaepiopsis gurkoi, the Gurkoi hawkmoth, is a moth of the family Sphingidae. The species was first described by Tomáš Melichar and Michal Řezáč in 2013. It is found in Tajikistan where it has been recorded at elevations above 3,500 meters in mountain steppe areas. It is possibly also found in Mongolia.

The wingspan is about 38 mm. Adults resemble Sphingonaepiopsis kuldjaensis, but the forewings are grey brown and the lighter areas have a tinge of light orange. Both the basal and medial bands are dark brown. The hindwings are dirty grey orange to light yellow. Adults have been recorded on wing in July.

References

Sphingonaepiopsis
Moths described in 2013